Black & Mild is a machine-made pipe tobacco cigar made by tobacco company John Middleton Co., located in Limerick, Pennsylvania. In November 2007, Altria, the parent company of Philip Morris purchased John Middleton, Inc.

Black & Milds are manufactured with a wrapper made from homogenized pipe tobacco and sold with a plastic or wood tip. Other versions also include untipped and shorts, which are about half the size of original versions.

The company recently coined the slogan, "Tastes great! Smells great!" due to the sweet smell that the smoke produces.

References

External links
Official Site
The History of Black & Mild Cigars

Cigar brands
Pipe tobacco brands
Companies based in Montgomery County, Pennsylvania
Altria Group subsidiaries